The 1987 USA Outdoor Track and Field Championships took place between June 26–27 at Jaguar Stadium on the campus of San Jose City College in San Jose, California. The meet was organized by The Athletics Congress.

As recently as six years before this meet, only two individuals had ever long jumped .  Here, three different individuals jumped further.

Results

Men track events

Men field events

Women track events

Women field events

See also
United States Olympic Trials (track and field)

References

 Results from T&FN
 results

USA Outdoor Track and Field Championships
Usa Outdoor Track And Field Championships, 1987
Track and field
Track and field in California
Outdoor Track and Field Championships
Outdoor Track and Field Championships
Sports competitions in California